Iffley Road is a major arterial road in Oxford, England. It leads from the Plain, near Magdalen Bridge, southeast towards the village of Iffley. While it becomes Henley Avenue at Iffley Turn, and then Rose Hill, the whole stretch from the ring road to the Plain is referred to by some as Iffley Road. Formerly named as Henley Road in the 19th century, as it leads towards Henley-on-Thames, this entire route is designated the A4158.

The road is the location for the Oxford University athletics venue, the Iffley Road Track, where Roger Bannister was the first person to run a mile in under four minutes, on 6 May 1954. The feat is commemorated by blue plaque on Iffley Road. The track is next door to Iffley Road rugby ground, home of Oxford University Rugby Football Club. Also in Iffley Road is Greyfriars, a Capucin priory that was formerly a permanent private hall of the University of Oxford. The Oxford Centre for Animal Ethics is based at 91 Iffley Road, and the headquarters of Transun are to be found at the start of the road.

There are a number of public houses including the Cape of Good Hope at the Plain and 1 Iffley Road, the Cricketers' Arms, now a cocktail bar renamed The Mad Hatter in 2013, and the Fir Tree Tavern.

Gallery

References

External links
 Streetmap of Iffley Road in Oxford
 Oxford University Track

Streets in Oxford
Roads in Oxfordshire